The British Journal of Educational Technology is a peer-reviewed academic journal published by Wiley on behalf of the British Educational Research Association. The journal covers developments in educational technology and articles cover the whole range of education and training, concentrating on the theory, applications, and development of educational technology and communications.

Abstracting and indexing 
The journal is abstracted and indexed in:

According to the Journal Citation Reports, the journal has a 2021 impact factor of 5.268, ranking it 23rd out of 267 journals in the category "Education & Educational Research". With this impact factor, BJET continues to rank second globally among generic educational technology journals.

References

External links 
 

Education journals
Bimonthly journals
English-language journals  
Educational technology journals 
Publications established in 1970
Wiley-Blackwell academic journals
1970 establishments in the United Kingdom
Academic journals associated with learned and professional societies of the United Kingdom